Up the Front is a 1972 British comedy film directed by Bob Kellett and starring Frankie Howerd, Bill Fraser, and Hermione Baddeley. It is the third film spin-off from the television series Up Pompeii! (the previous films being Up the Chastity Belt set in the Middle Ages which followed on from the Up Pompeii film). The plot concerns Lurk (a descendant of the slave Lurcio in Up Pompeii), a coward who is hypnotised into bravery.

Plot
Set during World War I, Lurk, a lowly servant in the household of Lord and Lady Twithampton, is hypnotised by The Great Vincento and travels to the Western Front to "save England". Lurk is inspired to bravery, and upon receiving the German master plan for the entire war, which has through an unlikely series of events been tattooed onto his posterior, is pursued across France by German intelligence.

After breaking into the British military headquarters to deliver the plans into the hands of General Burke, he is confronted by the sensuous German spy Mata Hari. After foiling Mata Hari's scheme to relieve him of the plan, a hilarious scene develops in which he is pursued by the nefarious Von Gutz and his henchmen Donner and Blitzen. Accompanied by the Can-Can, performed by the Famous Buttercup Girls, Lurk is pursued around the Allied headquarters. Finally, disguised as a tree, he is able to present the plans to General Burke, to the famous line:

General Burke: "Lurk, bend down".
Lurk: "I thought you'd never ask!"

Having successfully delivered the plans into the hands of British intelligence, Lurk receives a medal of honour and a promotion. He is therefore able to win the love of his beloved Fanny and defeat the machinations of the wicked Sgt. Major Groping.

Cast

Bob Hoskins' brief appearance in the film represents his mainstream debut.

Critical reception
The New York Times wrote that "the laughs come fast and furious when Howerd finds himself the recipient of the enemy's war plans--tattooed on his tush". TV Guide called the film "inane nonsense".

References

External links
 

1972 films
1970s historical comedy films
British historical comedy films
British war comedy films
Films shot at EMI-Elstree Studios
Films set in the 1910s
Western Front (World War I) films
Cultural depictions of Mata Hari
British satirical films
Films directed by Bob Kellett
Films based on television series
Films about hypnosis
EMI Films films
1970s war comedy films
Films scored by Peter Greenwell
Films with screenplays by Sid Colin
1970s English-language films
1970s British films